Pellizzer is an Italian surname. Notable people with the surname include:

Marina Pellizzer (born 1972), Italian footballer
Mark "Pelli" Pellizzer (born 1980), Canadian musician
Michele Pellizzer (born 1989), Italian footballer
Valentina Pellizzer, human rights activist and writer

Italian-language surnames